Organisation of Marxist–Leninists of Spain, in Spanish: Organización de Marxistas-Leninistas de España, (OMLE) was a Spanish communist group. OMLE was formed in Brussels in September 1968 by various nuclei that had left the Communist Party of Spain (PCE). OMLE denounced PCE as revisionist.

OMLE was a clandestine group along its existence owing to the pervasive activity of the Francoist police. It had its bases in a few urban pockets such as Cadiz and Vigo.

History
The OMLE held its first conference in June 1973. It was listed as a secret subversive group by the Francoist information services.

In 1974 a sector of Organización Obreira joined the OMLE.

In October 1975 OMLE convened the founding congress of the Communist Party of Spain (Reconstituted) (PCE(r)), which together with the First of October Anti-Fascist Resistance Groups (GRAPO) acted as the continuation of OMLE.

Publications
OMLE published Bandera Roja from 1969 onwards as its central organ and Antorcha as its theoretical organ. El Gallo Rojo was published by the Andalusia Regional Committee of OMLE.

The organization's  directing committee issued a 9-page declaration that was published in 1974.

See also
Communist Party of Spain (Marxist–Leninist) (historical) (PCE (m-l))
Spanish National Liberation Front (FELN)

References

External links
La incógnita de los GRAPO
Article on OMLE from the far-right paper "El Alcázar"

1968 establishments in Spain
1975 disestablishments in Spain
Anti-Francoism
Banned political parties in Spain
Banned communist parties
Defunct communist parties in Spain
Defunct Maoist parties
Maoist organizations in Europe
Political parties disestablished in 1975
Political parties established in 1968
Republican parties in Spain